The Four Trees is the debut studio album by Caspian. It was released on Dopamine Records on April 10, 2007 and reissued by The Mylene Sheath on March 13, 2010. The album has been released in CD and double LP format, with an out-of-print limited edition.

Track listing

Notes

External links
Sonicfrontiers.net: Review of "The Four Trees"

2007 debut albums
Caspian (band) albums